Fáskrúðsfjörður Airport  is an airport serving Fáskrúðsfjörður, Iceland.

See also
Transport in Iceland
List of airports in Iceland

References

 Google Earth

External links
 OurAirports - Fáskrúðsfjörður
 OpenStreetMap - Fáskrúðsfjörður
 Fáskrúðsfjörður Airport

Airports in Iceland